Ben Koehler (January 26, 1877, Schoerndorn, Germany – May 21, 1961, South Bend, Indiana) was a Major League Baseball player for the St. Louis Browns in 1905–1906. He was primarily an outfielder, though he played a few games as a first or second baseman.

Koehler played in a total of 208 games and had a lifetime batting average of .233, accumulating 168 hits, 2 home runs, and 62 RBI.

As a center fielder, Koehler helped turn 11 double plays in 1905, among the highest for that fielding position in a single season.

References
Baseball Reference
Ben Koehler at Baseball Almanac

1877 births
1961 deaths
Major League Baseball players from Germany
Major League Baseball outfielders
St. Louis Browns players
Minor league baseball managers
Battle Creek Cero Frutos players
Atlanta Crackers players
Natchez Indians players
St. Paul Saints (AA) players
South Bend Greens players
South Bend Bronchos players
Grand Rapids Grads players
Grand Rapids Black Sox players
Grand Rapids Bill-eds players
Jersey City Skeeters players
South Bend Benders players
St. Joseph Drummers players
Bay City Wolves players
Kalamazoo Celery Pickers players
Emigrants from the German Empire to the United States